Pleshanovo is the name of several rural localities in Russia:
Pleshanovo, Orenburg Oblast, a selo in Pleshanovsky Selsoviet of Krasnogvardeysky District of Orenburg Oblast
Pleshanovo, Palkinsky District, Pskov Oblast, a village in Palkinsky District, Pskov Oblast
Pleshanovo, Pytalovsky District, Pskov Oblast, a village in Pytalovsky District, Pskov Oblast
Pleshanovo, Vologda Oblast, a village in Nelazsky Selsoviet of Cherepovetsky District of Vologda Oblast